Amy Bogaard FBA is a Canadian archaeologist and Professor of Neolithic and Bronze Age Archaeology at the University of Oxford.

Education 
Bogaard earned a PhD from the University of Sheffield in 2002, supervised by Glynis Jones.

Career
Bogaard was appointed Lecturer of Neolithic and Bronze Age Archaeology at the School of Archaeology, University of Oxford. She was awarded the Shanghai Archaeology Forum Research Award in 2015.
She currently is a stipendiary lecturer at St Peter's College, and an external professor at the Santa Fe Institute.

Recent work has investigated the relationship between agricultural practices and inequality.

In 2013, Bogaard was awarded an ERC starter grant for the project The Agricultural Origins of Urban Civilization. In 2018, Bogaard was part of a team to win an ERC Synergy grant for the project Exploring the Dynamics and Causes of Prehistoric Land Use Change in the Cradle of European Farming. She is a member of the ERC-funded FEEDSAX Project.

Bogaard was elected as a Fellow of the British Academy in 2020.

Selected publications

Books 

Neolithic Farming in Central Europe (2004). London: Routledge.
Plant Use and Crop Husbandry in an Early Neolithic Village (2011): Vaihingen an der Enz, Baden-Württemberg. Frankfurter Archäologische Schriften. Bonn: Habelt-Verlag.

Journal articles 
Bogaard, A. 2005. Garden agriculture’and the nature of early farming in Europe and the Near East. World Archaeology 37.2: 177-196.
Bogaard, A. et al 2007. "The impact of manuring on nitrogen isotope ratios in cereals: archaeological implications for reconstruction of diet and crop management practices." Journal of Archaeological Science 34.3: 335-343.
Bogaard, A. et al 2013. Crop manuring and intensive land management by Europe’s first farmers. Proceedings of the National Academy of Sciences, 110(31), 12589-12594.

References

Living people
British archaeologists
Academics of the University of Oxford
British women archaeologists
Archaeobotanists
Year of birth missing (living people)
Fellows of the British Academy